Intel hexadecimal object file format, Intel hex format or Intellec Hex is a file format that conveys binary information in ASCII text form. It is commonly used for programming microcontrollers, EPROMs, and other types of programmable logic devices and hardware emulators. In a typical application, a compiler or assembler converts a program's source code (such as in C or assembly language) to machine code and outputs it into a HEX file. Some also use it as a container format holding packets of stream data. Common file extensions used for the resulting files are .HEX or .H86. The HEX file is then read by a programmer to write the machine code into a PROM or is transferred to the target system for loading and execution.

History
The Intel hex format was originally designed for Intel's Intellec Microcomputer Development Systems (MDS) in 1973 in order to load and execute programs from paper tape. It was also used to specify memory contents to Intel for ROM production. In 1973, Intel's "software group" consisted only of Bill Byerly and Ken Burget, and Gary Kildall as an external consultant. Beginning in 1975, the format was utilized by MCS Series II ISIS-II systems, using the file extension HEX. Many PROM and EPROM programming devices accepted this format.

Format
Intel HEX consists of lines of ASCII text that are separated by line feed or carriage return characters or both. Each text line contains hexadecimal characters that encode multiple binary numbers. The binary numbers may represent data, memory addresses, or other values, depending on their position in the line and the type and length of the line. Each text line is called a record.

Record structure
A record (line of text) consists of six fields (parts) that appear in order from left to right:
 Start code, one character, an ASCII colon ''. All characters preceding this symbol in a record should be ignored. In fact, very early versions of the specification even asked for a minimum of 25 NUL characters to precede the first record and follow the last one. However, as this was a little known part of the specification, not all software written copes with this correctly. It allows to store other related information in the same file (and even the same line), a facility used by various software development utilities to store symbol tables or additional comments, and third-party extensions using other characters as start code like the digit '' by Keil, '' by Mostek, or '', '', '', '', '' and '' by TDL. By convention, '' is often used for comments. Neither of these extensions may contain any ':' characters as part of the payload.
 Byte count, two hex digits (one hex digit pair), indicating the number of bytes (hex digit pairs) in the data field. The maximum byte count is 255 (0xFF). 8 (0x08), 16 (0x10) and 32 (0x20) are commonly used byte counts. Not all software copes with counts larger than 16.
 Address, four hex digits, representing the 16-bit beginning memory address offset of the data. The physical address of the data is computed by adding this offset to a previously established base address, thus allowing memory addressing beyond the 64 kilobyte limit of 16-bit addresses. The base address, which defaults to zero, can be changed by various types of records. Base addresses and address offsets are always expressed as big endian values.
 Data, a sequence of n bytes of data, represented by 2n hex digits. Some records omit this field (n equals zero). The meaning and interpretation of data bytes depends on the application. (4-bit data will either have to be stored in the lower or upper half of the bytes, that is, one byte holds only one addressable data item.)
 Checksum, two hex digits, a computed value that can be used to verify the record has no errors.

Color legend
As a visual aid, the fields of Intel HEX records are colored throughout this article as follows:

Checksum calculation
A record's checksum byte is the two's complement of the least significant byte (LSB) of the sum of all decoded byte values in the record preceding the checksum. It is computed by summing the decoded byte values and extracting the LSB of the sum (i.e., the data checksum), and then calculating the two's complement of the LSB (e.g., by inverting its bits and adding one).

For example, in the case of the record , the sum of the decoded byte values is  +  +  +  +  +  +  = E2, which has LSB value E2.

The validity of a record can be checked by computing its checksum and verifying that the computed checksum equals the checksum appearing in the record; an error is indicated if the checksums differ. Since the record's checksum byte is the two's complement — and therefore the additive inverse — of the data checksum, this process can be reduced to summing all decoded byte values, including the record's checksum, and verifying that the LSB of the sum is zero. When applied to the preceding example, this method produces the following result:  +  +  +  +  +  +  +  = 100, which has LSB value 00.

Text line terminators
Intel HEX records are usually separated by one or more ASCII line termination characters so that each record appears alone on a text line. This enhances readability by visually delimiting the records and it also provides padding between records that can be used to improve machine parsing efficiency. However, the line termination characters are optional, as the '' is used to detect the start of a record.

Programs that create HEX records typically use line termination characters that conform to the conventions of their operating systems. For example, Linux programs use a single LF (line feed, hex value 0A) character to terminate lines, whereas Windows programs use a CR (carriage return, hex value 0D) followed by a LF.

Record types
Intel HEX has six standard record types:

Named formats
The original 4-bit/8-bit Intellec Hex Paper Tape Format and Intellec Hex Computer Punched Card Format in 1973/1974 supported only one record type . This was expanded around 1975 to also support record type . It could include an optional header containing a symbol table for symbolic debugging, all characters in a record preceding the colon are ignored.

Special names are sometimes used to denote the formats of HEX files that employ specific subsets of record types. For example:

 I8HEX files use only record types  and 
 I16HEX files use only record types  through 

File example
This example shows a file that has four data records followed by an end-of-file record:

Variants
Besides Intel's own extension, several third-parties have also defined variants and extensions of the Intel hex format, including Digital Research (as in the so-called "Digital Research hex format"), Zilog, Mostek, TDL, Texas Instruments, Microchip, c't, Wayne and Layne, and BBC/Micro:bit Educational Foundation (with its "Universal Hex Format"). These can have information on program entry points and register contents, a swapped byte order in the data fields, fill values for unused areas, fuse bits, and other differences.

The Digital Research hex format for 8086 processors supports segment information by adding record types to distinguish between code, data, stack, and extra segments.

Most assemblers for CP/M-80 (and also XASM09 for the Motorola 6809) don't use record type 01h to indicate the end of a file, but use a zero-length data type 00h entry instead. This eases the concatenation of multiple hex files.

Texas Instruments defines a variant where addresses are based on the bit-width of a processor's registers, not bytes.

Microchip defines variants INTHX8S (INHX8L, INHX8H), INHX8M, INHX16 (INHX16M) and INHX32 for their PIC microcontrollers.

Alfred Arnold's cross-macro-assembler AS, Werner Hennig-Roleff's 8051-emulator SIM51, and Matthias R. Paul's cross-converter BINTEL are also known to define extensions to the Intel hex format.

See also 
 Binary-to-text encoding, a survey and comparison of encoding algorithms
 MOS Technology file format
 Motorola S-record hex format
 Tektronix hex format

References

Further reading
 
 
 
  (32 pages)

External links
 binex - a converter between Intel HEX and binary for Windows.
 SRecord, a converter between Intel HEX and binary for Linux (usage), C++ source code.
 kk_ihex, open source C library for reading and writing Intel HEX
 libgis, open source C library that converts Intel HEX, Motorola S-Record, Atmel Generic files.
 bincopy is a Python package for manipulating Intel HEX files.
 SwiftIntelHex - a Swift package to parse Intel HEX files for iOS and macOS.

Binary-to-text encoding formats
Embedded systems
Computer file formats